Connelley (from Ó Conghalaigh) may refer to:

People
 William E. Connelley
or similar sounding
 Connolly (surname)
 Connelly (surname)

See also
 Connolly (disambiguation)
 Connelly (disambiguation)